David Stefanović (born David Jovanović, 15 August 2002) is a Swiss professional footballer who plays for Chiasso. While he primarily plays on the left of midfield, he can also play fullback, centrally and on the right hand side of the pitch.

Professional career
Stefanovic made his professional debut with FC Lugano in a 1-0 Swiss Super League win over Neuchâtel Xamax on 3 August 2020.

On 7 July 2021, he signed with Chiasso.

Personal life
Born in Switzerland, Stefanovic is of Serbian descent. Stefanovic originally went by David Jovanovic but changed his name in January 2021 for unknown reasons.

References

External links
 
 SFL Profile

2001 births
Living people
People from Sorengo
Swiss men's footballers
Swiss people of Serbian descent
Association football fullbacks
FC Lugano players
FC Chiasso players
Swiss Super League players
Sportspeople from Ticino